Bright Moments is an album by American jazz drummer Max Roach recorded in 1986 for the Italian Soul Note label.

Reception
The Allmusic review by Scott Yanow awarded the album 4½ stars, calling it "A frequently exquisite yet adventurous album, highly recommended".

Track listing
 "Bright Moments" (Rahsaan Roland Kirk) - 9:08 
 "Elixir Suite" (Odean Pope) - 9:45 
 "Hi-Fly" (Randy Weston) - 7:46 
 "Tribute to Duke and Mingus" (Tyrone Brown) - 5:23 
 "Double Delight" (Steve Turre) - 8:53 
Recorded at Sound Ideas Studio, New York on October 1 & 2, 1986

Personnel
Max Roach - percussion
Cecil Bridgewater - trumpet
Odean Pope - tenor saxophone
Diane Monroe, Lesa Terry - violin
Maxine Roach - viola
Zela Terry - cello
Tyrone Brown - electric bass

References

Black Saint/Soul Note albums
Max Roach albums
1986 albums